The Scrapper is a 1917 American short Western drama directed by John Ford, who at that time was credited as "Jack Ford". The film is considered to be lost.

Cast
 John Ford as Buck, the scrapper (credited as Jack Ford)
 Louise Granville as Helen Dawson
 Duke Worne as Jerry Martin
 Jean Hathaway
 Martha Hayes

References

External links
 

1917 films
American silent short films
American black-and-white films
1917 Western (genre) films
1917 short films
Films directed by John Ford
Lost Western (genre) films
Lost American films
1917 lost films
Silent American Western (genre) films
1910s American films
1910s English-language films